Ichnotropis  tanganicana also known as the Tanzanian rough-scaled lizard, is a species of lizard found in Tanzania and Burundi.

References

Ichnotropis
Lacertid lizards of Africa
Vertebrates of Burundi
Reptiles of Tanzania
Reptiles described in 1917
Taxa named by George Albert Boulenger